Red Swan may refer to:
 "Red Swan" (song), a song by Yoshiki feat. Hyde
 Red swan, a motif in the Kandyan jewellery of Sri Lanka
 "Red Swan", a song from Susumu Yokota's 2002 album The Boy and the Tree
 "Red Swan", a song from the video game Pump It Up
 Red Swan, a book by Sebastian Heilmann
 Red Swan, a statue by Rainer Lagemann

See also 
 Red Swan Hotel, a fictional hotel in Brial O'Nolan's 1939 novel At Swim-Two-Birds
 Red (disambiguation)
 Swan (disambiguation)